A statue of Roberto Clemente was installed at the Louisville Slugger Museum & Factory in Louisville, Kentucky, in 2021.

See also 

 Legacy of Roberto Clemente

References

2020s establishments in Kentucky
2021 establishments in Kentucky
2021 sculptures
Monuments and memorials in Kentucky
Roberto Clemente
Sculptures of African Americans
Statues in Kentucky
Statues of sportspeople